The rue Saint-Honoré is a street in the 1st arrondissement of Paris, France.

It is named after the collegial  situated in ancient times within the cloisters of Saint-Honoré.

The street, on which are located a number of museums and upscale boutiques, is near the Jardin des Tuileries and the Saint-Honoré market. Like many streets in the heart of Paris, the rue Saint-Honoré, as it is now known, was laid out as early as the Middle Ages or before.

The street, at one time, continued beyond the former city walls into what was the faubourg (from Latin foris burgem, an area "outside the city").  This continuation was eventually named the rue du Faubourg Saint-Honoré.

History
The rue Saint-Honoré has been given the following names in its long history:
The section between the rue de la Lingerie and the rue de la Tonnellerie was named the rue de la Chausseterie from 1300 to the 17th century.
The section between the now extinct rue Tirechappe and the rue de l'Arbre Sec was named the rue du Chastiau Festu (1300) or du Château Fêtu.
The section between the rue de l'Arbre Sec and the now defunct rue du Rempart was named the rue de la Croix du Trahoir, rue de la Croix du Tiroir or rue du Traihoir, du Traihouer, du Trayoir, du Trahoir, du Triouer, or du Trioir between the 13th and 14th centuries; and the rue de la chaussée Saint-Honoré from 1450.
The section between the now extinct rue du Rempart and the rue Royale was known successively as the chemin de Clichy (1204), grand chemin Saint-Honoré (1283), chaussée Saint-Honoré (1370), grand chemin de la porte Saint-Honoré (1392), chemin Royal (1393), nouvelle rue Saint-Louis (1407), grand rue Saint-Louis (1421), rue Neuve-Saint-Louis (1430), grande rue du Faubourg Saint-Honoré (1609), chaussée Saint-Honoré (1634), rue Neuve-Saint-Honoré (1638)
In 1966, the part between the Palais-Royal, Théâtre Français, and place André Malraux was given the name place Colette.

Notable landmarks

 On 8 September 1429, Jeanne d'Arc was wounded at the Porte Saint-Honoré (Saint-Honoré Gate) in her unsuccessful attack on Paris, at the time when it was held by the English.
 In 1631, the old Porte Saint-Honoré, across from the rue de Richelieu, was torn down and replaced, facing the rue Royale.
 In 1670, the northern fortifications of Paris were demolished and the street was called the boulevard Saint-Honoré, traversing from the rue Saint-Antoine to the rue Saint-Martin.
 number 9: 14 May 1610, King Henry IV of France (Henri IV) was assassinated by Catholic zealot François Ravaillac.
 number 92: 15 January 1622, the playwright known as Molière was born.
 number 129 was where Louis Gaston Hebert, one of the founding pioneers of Canada, was born and lived prior to his journey with his wife and three children to New France in 1620.
 number 145: The Oratoire du Louvre Protestant church.
 numbers 146, 148, and 150: The remains of King Philip II are entombed.
 number 182: The Immeuble des Bons-Enfants, arm of the French Ministry of Culture was built between 2000 and 2004. The façade facing the street, clad with an ornamental metallic net ("résille"), is the work of Léon Vaudoyer. Executing architects were Francis Soler and Frédéric Druot.
 number 204: The Palais-Royal (originally the Palais-Richelieu), built in 1629 by Cardinal Richelieu, is now also the seat of the Comédie-Française
 number 211: The former Hôtel de Noailles, later Bertin, built in 1715 by Pierre Cailleteau dit Lassurance on the site of the former Hôtel Pussort, of which some parts still exist, surrounded by buildings of the Hôtel Saint-James et Albany.
Louis XVI, Marie-Antoinette and their family were imprisoned there during three days after the Insurrection of 10 August. Later, banker Claude Perier fitted out his town house in the estate.
 number 239: Hôtel Costes
 number 251: Nouveau Cirque, from 1886 to 1936.
 numbers 263 and 265: Église Notre-Dame-de-l'Assomption de Paris
 number 273: During the French Revolution, Sieyès lived at this address.
 number 284: Église Saint-Roch
 number 314: last residence of the Spanish composer Juan Chrisostomo Arriaga y Balzola (1806-1826)
 number 398: Maximilien de Robespierre was sheltered by Maurice Duplay. The cart which took Robespierre to the guillotine on the place de la Concorde on 28 July 1794 made a stop in front of this house.

Bibliography

 Bernard Stéphane and Franz-Olivier Giesbert. Petite et Grande Histoire des rues de Paris. Paris: Albin Michel, 2000. . 
 Bernard-Claude Galey. Origines surprenantes des noms de villages, des noms des rues de Paris et de villes de province. Paris: Le Cherche Midi, 2004. . .
 Anne Thorval. Promenades sur les lieux de l'histoire: D'Henri IV à Mai 68, les rues de Paris racontent l'histoire de France. Paris: Paragamme, 2004. . .

Streets in the 1st arrondissement of Paris